Bowle Spring Branch is a  long 1st order tributary to Stokes Creek in Halifax County, Virginia.

Course 
Bowle Spring Branch rises in a pond about 1,5 miles west of Cluster Springs, Virginia, and then flows northeast to join Stokes Creek about 1 mile north-northwest of Cluster Springs.

Watershed 
Bowle Spring Branch drains  of area, receives about 45.7 in/year of precipitation, has a wetness index of 416.04, and is about 59% forested.

See also 
 List of Virginia Rivers

References

Watershed Maps 

Rivers of Virginia
Rivers of Halifax County, Virginia
Tributaries of the Roanoke River